Plagiobothrys tenellus is a species of flowering plant in the borage family known by the common names Pacific popcornflower and slender popcornflower. It is native to western North America from British Columbia to Mexico, where it is a common member of the flora in several types of habitat.

Description
Plagiobothrys tenellus is an annual herb producing several erect stems up to about 30 centimeters tall. It is very hairy in texture, the hairs long and white. The leaves are located in a basal rosette around the stem and there are a few smaller ones along the stem itself. The inflorescence is a coiling branch bearing many small five-lobed white flowers. Each flower is 1 to 3 millimeters wide. The fruit is a tiny cross-shaped nutlet covered in bumps and grooves.

External links
Jepson Manual Treatment: Plagiobothrys tenellus
Plagiobothrys tenellus Photo gallery

tenellus
Flora of the Western United States
Flora of California
Flora of Canada
Flora of Northwestern Mexico
Flora without expected TNC conservation status